

343001–343100 

|-id=057
| 343057 Lucaravenni ||  || Luca Ravenni (1968–2015) was a software analyst and an amateur astronomer. In 1997 he graduated in Mathematics with a thesis on gravity-assisted trajectories for space missions. He collaborated with the Torre Luciana Observatory. Name suggested by the Astronomical Observatory of the University of Siena. || 
|}

343101–343200 

|-id=134
| 343134 Bizet ||  || Georges Bizet (1838 - 1875) was a French composer of the Romantic era. Bizet achieved few successes before his final work, Carmen, which has become one of the most popular and frequently performed works in the entire opera repertoire. || 
|-id=157
| 343157 Mindaugas ||  || Mindaugas (1200–1263), the first known Grand Duke of Lithuania and the King of Lithuania. || 
|-id=158
| 343158 Marsyas ||  || Marsyas, a Phrygian Satyr dared oppose Apollo in a musical duel. Marsyas lost when he could not play his flute upside-down. For his hubris he was tied to a tree, flayed, his blood turned into a stream. Marsyas is so named for its unusual retrograde orbit, that which opposes the motion of most solar system objects, Apollos included. || 
|}

343201–343300 

|-id=230
| 343230 Corsini ||  || Enrico Maria Corsini (born 1969) is an astronomer and professor of astrophysics at Padua University in Italy. || 
|}

343301–343400 

|-id=322
| 343322 Tomskuniver || 2010 CK || Tomsk State University is a recognized center of education and science. Founded on 1878 May 28 by a decree of Russian Emperor Alexander II, it was the first university in the Asian part of Russia. || 
|}

343401–343500 

|-id=444
| 343444 Halluzinelle ||  || "Analoge Halluzinelle", a fictional female robot hologram in the satirical German science fiction TV-series Ijon Tichy: Space Pilot. The role is played by the actress Nora Tschirner. The story is based on The Star Diaries by Stanisław Lem. || 
|}

343501–343600 

|-id=587
| 343587 Mamuna ||  || Nikolai Vladimirovich Mamuna (1956–2016) was an astronomer, teacher and leading lecturer of the Moscow Planetarium. He was artistic director of the Maximachev Planetarium, the author of a number of books and many journal publications, a science fiction writer, a radio and a TV host. || 
|}

343601–343700 

|-id=664
| 343664 Nataliemainzer ||  || Natalie Mainzer (born 1978) is an American nurse who has cared for many patients suffering from COVID–19 during the global pandemic. || 
|}

343701–343800 

|-id=743
| 343743 Kjurkchieva ||  || Diana Kjurkchieva (born 1952) is a Professor in Astronomy at the University of Shumen, Bulgaria and current President of the Bulgarian Astronomical Union. She works on the observation and modeling of variable stars, exoplanets and is the leading popularizer of astronomy science in Bulgaria. Name suggested by S. Ibryamov. || 
|}

343801–343900 

|-bgcolor=#f2f2f2
| colspan=4 align=center | 
|}

343901–344000 

|-id=000
| 344000 Astropolis ||  || The Kiev Club Astropolis, the largest association of amateur astronomers in the Ukraine || 
|}

References 

343001-344000